= Trundeh Ki Kori =

- Location within Pakistan
- Coordinates: 33.24°N 73.17°E
- Country: Pakistan
- Province: Islamabad C.T
- District: Islamabad District
- Elevation: 519 m (1,703 ft)
- Time zone: UTC+5 (PST)

Trundeh Ki Kori is a town in the Islamabad Capital Territory of Pakistan. It is located at 33° 24' 45N 73° 17' 20E with an altitude of 519 metres (1706 feet).
